E90 can refer to:

Transportation
 BMW 3 Series (E90), an automobile platform
 Embraer 190, an aircraft
 European route E90
 Toyota Corolla (E90), an automobile platform
 Sakai Senboku Road, route E90 in Japan

Other uses
 Nokia E90 Communicator, a 3G smartphone
 King's Indian Defense (ECHO code: E90), a chess opening
 E-90 Super Sweeper, a robot that appears in Sonic X remebeleses Thunderbird 2